The 2007–08 season was PFC CSKA Sofia's 60th consecutive season in A Group. This article shows player statistics and all matches (official and friendly) that the club have and will play during the 2007–08 season.

Players

Squad information 

Appearances for competitive matches only

|-
|colspan="14"|Players sold or loaned out after the start of the season:

|}

As of game played start of season

Players in/out

Summer transfers 

In:

Out:

Winter transfers 

In:

Out:

Pre-season and friendlies

Competitions

A Group

Table

Results summary

Results by round

Fixtures and results

Bulgarian Cup

UEFA Cup

Second qualifying round

First round

See also
List of unbeaten football club seasons

External links 
 Official Site

PFC CSKA Sofia seasons
Cska Sofia
Bulgarian football championship-winning seasons